The wine cup of Shah Jahan is a wine cup of white nephrite jade that was made for the Mughal emperor Shah Jahan. 

The cup has a gourd shape like in a paisley design. The handle is shaped like the head of a ram. The bottom features acanthus leaves and a lotus flower, which is the pedestal. The cup is inscribed with his title, "Second Lord of the Conjunction", following the conventions of royal titulature in the Persian-speaking world. It specifically alludes to Timur, the central Asian ruler from whom the Mughals were descended. The artist who created the cup is unknown. 

The cup is dated 1067 of the Islamic calendar, and regnal year 31, which convert to 1657 CE. The place of production was India. The length is 18.7 cm and width 14 cm. It was acquired in the 19th century by Colonel Charles Seton Guthrie, most probably after the Indian rebellion of 1857. It was formerly in the possession of R. M. W. Walker, on whose death it was sold by Christie & Co (12/7/1945, lot 146) and passed from the purchasers, Messrs Spink, to Queen Maria of Yugoslavia. It again came into the hands of Spink, who then sold it to Mr Lazarus, who discovered the inscription and sold it back to the vendors. It was acquired by the Victoria and Albert Museum in 1962.

Further reading 
 Swallow, Deborah and John Guy eds. Arts of India: 1550-1900. Text by Rosemary Crill, John Guy, Veronica Murphy, Susan Stronge and Deborah Swallow. London : V&A Publications, 1990, pp. 94-95, ill. no. 73.
 Robert Skelton, The Shah Jahan cup, V&A Masterpiece leaflet
 Susan Stronge, 'Colonel Guthrie's Collection', Oriental Art, vol. XXXIX, no. 4, 1993-4, fig. 1 p. 5.
 Rosemary Crill, in The Indian Heritage. Court Life and Arts under Mughal Rule, V&A, 1982, cat. 318, p.111, .

See also

Wine accessory
Wine tasting

References

External links

 Victoria and Albert Museum| Wine cup of Shah Jahan

Asian objects in the Victoria and Albert Museum
Mughal art
Red Fort
Wine accessories
Individual hardstone carvings
Indian wine
17th century in India